Rodolfo Gucci (16 July 1912 – 15 May 1983), also known by his stage name Maurizio D'Ancora, was an Italian actor and entrepreneur, who appeared in more than 40 films between 1929 and 1946. He was a member of the Gucci family. His only child, Maurizio Gucci, was named after his stage name.

Biography 
Rodolfo Gucci was born in 1912 in Florence, Italy to Aida Calvelli and Guccio Gucci. He was one of five sons and one daughter.

He was spotted by the director Alfred Lind who gave him his film debut in 1929. The same year he appeared in Mario Camerini's Rails, which launched his career. He used Maurizio D'Ancora as his screen name. While filming Together in the Dark, he met his future wife. He was married in 1944 in Venice, Italy to the actress Sandra Ravel. Their only child was born in 1948, Maurizio, named after his father's stage name.

Member of the Gucci Family 
He was one of the five sons of Guccio Gucci, founder of the eponymous fashion house. In January 1953, D'Ancora left acting and returned to the family business after the death of his father. In 1952, Rodolfo and his brothers Aldo and Vasco traveled to New York City. They opened the first Gucci store outside of Italy in New York City, only two weeks before their father's death. In 1967, he created the Gucci Flora scarf for Grace Kelly.

After their brother Vasco Gucci died in 1974, Rodolfo and Aldo divided the business among themselves 50/50. However, Aldo's sons felt that Rodolfo had not contributed enough to the growth of the business. In an attempt to increase his profits, Aldo set up a perfume subsidiary and held 80 percent of its ownership for himself and his three sons. This rivalry eventually spiralled into family warfare.

Death and legacy 
Rodolfo Gucci died in 1983 in Milan. After his death, his son Maurizio Gucci inherited his majority stake in the company and became the majority shareholder. After a nearly six-year legal battle for control over Gucci against Aldo Gucci, in 1989 Maurizio Gucci was made chairman of the Gucci group. Maurizio did not have a background in business, and by 1993 the business was in dire economic and creative straits. That year Maurizio Gucci resigned and sold his remaining interest to Investcorp, ending the Gucci family's association with the company. In 1995, Maurizio Gucci was gunned down by a hired hit man. In 1998, his ex-wife Patrizia Reggiani was convicted of arranging the killing.

In popular culture
In the film House of Gucci (2021), Rodolfo Gucci is played by English actor Jeremy Irons.

Filmography

References

Further reading 
 Landy, Marcia. The Folklore of Consensus: Theatricality in the Italian Cinema, 1930–1943. SUNY Press, 1998.

External links 
 

1912 births
1983 deaths
Italian male film actors
Actors from Florence
20th-century Italian male actors
Gucci people
Businesspeople from Florence